The 19th Ibero-American Championships in Athletics were held at the Estadi Olímpic Camilo Cano in Spain in La Nucía (most events) and Torrevieja (half marathon), between May 20 and 22, 2022. The competition was originally scheduled to take place in 2020 in Santa Cruz de Tenerife but had to be cancelled due to the COVID-19 pandemic.

Medal summary

Men

Women

Medal table
Hosts Spain led the medal table with a total of 30 medals with Dominican Republic and Cuba in the second and third place respectively.

Participating nations
A total of 395 athletes from 23 countries participated.

 (16)
 (24)
 (4)
 (70)
 (3)
 (24)
 (16)
 (1)
 (16)
 (20)
 (20)
 (3)
 (5)
 (5)
 (1)
 (1)
 (14)
 (42)
 (16)
 (64)
 (3)
 (11)
 (16)

External links
Live results
Final results

References

Ibero-American Championships in Athletics
Ibero-American Championships in Athletics, 2022
Ibero-American Championships
Ibero-American Championships
Ibero-American Championships in Athletics